Anne Gertrude Gambrill (née Shorland)  is a retired New Zealand lawyer and judge. She was the first woman to sit on the High Court bench in New Zealand.

Gambrill attended Samuel Marsden Collegiate School in Wellington, for her first few years of secondary schooling. She finished her high school studies at Nga Tawa Diocesan School in 1952. She studied law and was admitted as a solicitor in 1958 and as a barrister in 1960. In 1987 she was appointed as a master of the High Court of New Zealand, a position she held for 15 years.

Gambrill was appointed to the Insolvency Court in 1999, and she also served on the Legal Services Agency Review Panel. She retired from the judiciary in 2002.

Gambrill has held a number of community roles. She was the second president of the Auckland Zonta International Club, and has been an active member of the club for over 50 years. In the 1980s and 1990s she was the Chair of the Auckland Branch of the Samuel Marsden Collegiate Old Girls Association; she was the chairperson of the Auckland Decorative and Fine Arts Society and has served on the International Education Appeal Authority dealing with complaints from international students in New Zealand.

In 2003 Gambrill received the New Zealand Order of Merit for services to the high court.

References

New Zealand women lawyers
High Court of New Zealand judges
Companions of the New Zealand Order of Merit
Living people
Year of birth missing (living people)
People educated at Samuel Marsden Collegiate School
People educated at Nga Tawa Diocesan School